Sven Grossegger (born 17 November 1987) is an Austrian biathlete. He competed in the 2014/15 world cup season, and represented Austria at the Biathlon World Championships 2015 in Kontiolahti.

References

External links 
 

1987 births
Living people
Austrian male biathletes